The men's javelin throw at the 1954 European Athletics Championships was held in Bern, Switzerland, at Stadion Neufeld on 28 and 29 August 1954.

Medalists

Results

Final
29 August

Qualification
28 August

Participation
According to an unofficial count, 21 athletes from 15 countries participated in the event.

 (2)
 (1)
 (1)
 (1)
 (1)
 (1)
 (1)
 (2)
 (1)
 (2)
 (2)
 (1)
 (1)
 (2)
 (2)

References

Javelin throw
Javelin throw at the European Athletics Championships